Hussein Al-Dhufairi is a citizen of Kuwait who is a suspected member of Daesh (ISIL).  He was arrested, in Manila, Philippines, in March, 2017.  He was arrested with Rahaf Zina, a Syrian woman, also suspected of being a member of the group.  He was extradited to Kuwait, in April, 2017.  The Arab Times reported that Rahaf Zina was al-Dhufairi was his wife.  The Philippine Daily Inquirer described her as his sister-in-law, and widow of his recently deceased brother, senior Daesh leader, Abdul Mohsen Al-Dhufairi.  The Kuwait Times reported Hussein married his brother's widow.

The Arab Times reported that, following his arrest in Manila, Kuwait executed raids, arresting three of his relatives, and seven other individuals they believed to be his Daesh associates.  Officials had orders to "shoot to kill", during the raids.  The Arab Times reported that officials found bomb-making supplies during the raids.

Al-Dhufairi entered the Philippines on January 28, 2017.  He was reported to have entered the Philippines on a legal work visa.  Al-Dhufairi is reported to have contacted Kuwait's diplomatic officials, in the Philippines, to arrange legal travel documents to return to Kuwait.

Daesh leader, Abdul Mohsen Al-Dhufairi, said to be Hussain's brother, was described as "one of the most dangerous Kuwaiti members of Daesh".

References

1977 births
Islamic State of Iraq and the Levant members from Kuwait
Living people